MaxPreps is an American website that specializes in coverage of American high school sports.  The site is owned by Paramount Global and is a division of CBS Sports. Founded on August 1, 2002, the company has covered up to 29 sports, including boys, girls, and co-ed sports. MaxPreps is currently headquartered in El Dorado Hills, California.

History
MaxPreps was founded in August 2002 by Andy Beal.  According to Beal, his goal was to cover "Every team, every game, and every player in High School Sports."  In 2007, the company was acquired by CBS Interactive.

Sports covered
As of 2017, MaxPreps covered a total of 29 sports.  They categorize sports into one of three categories: Boys, Girls, and Co-Ed.  Five sports are exclusive to boys, five are exclusive to girls.  Fifteen sports had separate male and female variants, while four were strictly co-ed.  Below is a breakdown of the sports covered.

MaxPreps Cup
Every year MaxPreps awards an American high school the MaxPreps Cup, signifying that they are the #1 Athletic Program in the Nation. They have been awarding it since 2011. Before 2011, the award was just called #1 Athletic Program in the Nation. 

Sources:

References

American sport websites
Internet properties established in 2002
2002 establishments in California
CBS Interactive websites
CBS Sports